The Kingdom of Mapungubwe (Maphungubgwe, c. 1075–c. 1220) was a medieval state in South Africa located at the confluence of the Shashe and Limpopo rivers, south of Great Zimbabwe. The name is derived from either TjiKalanga and Tshivenda. The name might mean "Hill of Jackals" or "stone monuments". The kingdom was the first stage in a development that would culminate in the creation of the Kingdom of Zimbabwe in the 13th century, and with gold trading links to Rhapta and Kilwa Kisiwani on the African east coast. The Kingdom of Mapungubwe lasted about 80 years, and at its height the capital's population was about 5000 people.

This archaeological site can be attributed to the BuKalanga Kingdom, which comprised the Kalanga people from northeast Botswana and western/central southern Zimbabwe, the Nambiya south of the Zambezi Valley, and the Vha Venda in the northeast of South Africa. The Mapungubwe Collection of artifacts found at the archaeological site is housed in the Mapungubwe Museum in Pretoria.

Origin

The largest settlement from what has been dubbed the Leopard's Kopje culture is known as the K2 culture and was the immediate predecessor to the settlement of Mapungubwe. The people of the K2 culture, probably derived from the ancestors of the Shona and Kalanga people of southern Africa, was attracted to the Shashi-Limpopo area, likely because it provided mixed agricultural possibilities. The area was also prime elephant country, providing access to valuable ivory. The control of the gold and ivory trade greatly increased the political power of the K2 culture. By 1075, the population of K2 had outgrown the area and relocated to Mapungubwe Hill.

Stone masonry
Spatial organisation in the kingdom of Mapungubwe involved the use of stone walls to demarcate important areas for the first time. There was a stone-walled residence likely occupied by the principal councillor. Stone and wood were used together. There would have also been a wooden palisade surrounding Mapungubwe Hill. Most of the capital's population would have lived inside the western wall.

Origins of the name
The capital of the kingdom was called Mapungubwe, which is where the kingdom gets its name. The site of the city is now a World Heritage Site, South African National Heritage Site, national park, and archaeological site. There is controversy regarding the origin and meaning of the name Mapungubwe. Conventional wisdom has it that Mapungubwe means "place of jackals," or alternatively, "place where jackals eat", thavha ya dzi phunguhwe, or, according to Fouché—one of the earliest excavators of Mapungubwe—"hill of the jackals" (Fouché, 1937 p. 1). It also means "place of wisdom" and "the place where the rock turns into liquid"—from various ethnicities in the region including the Pedi, Sotho, Venda and Kalanga.

Culture and society
Mapungubwean society is thought by archaeologists to be the first class-based social system in southern Africa; that is, its leaders were separated from and higher in rank than its inhabitants. Mapungubwe's architecture and spatial arrangement also provide "the earliest evidence for sacred leadership in southern Africa".

Life in Mapungubwe was centred on family and farming. Special sites were created for initiation ceremonies, household activities, and other social functions. Cattle lived in kraals located close to the residents' houses, signifying their value.

Most speculation about society continues to be based upon the remains of buildings, since the Mapungubweans left no written record.

The kingdom was likely divided into a three-tiered hierarchy with the commoners inhabiting low-lying sites, district leaders occupying small hilltops, and the capital at Mapungubwe hill as the supreme authority. Elites within the kingdom were buried in hills. Royal wives lived in their own area away from the king. Important men maintained prestigious homes on the outskirts of the capital. This type of spatial division occurred first at Mapungubwe but would be replicated in later Butua and Rozwi states. The growth in population at Mapungubwe may have led to full-time specialists in ceramics, specifically pottery. Gold objects were uncovered in elite burials on the royal hill (Mapungubwe Hill).

Re-discovery
On New Year's Eve 1932, ESJ van Graan, a local farmer and prospector, and his son, a former student of the University of Pretoria, set out to follow up on a legend he had heard about.

According to an article published in 1985, translated from the Afrikaans text: Remains of a Rock Fort located on top of the hill were under investigation, dated back to the 11th century. Access to the Archeological site for the public is limited to supervised visits and tours. However, some of the items discovered were put on display at the Department of Archeology, at the University of Pretoria. Mapungubwe Hill and K2 were declared national monuments in the 1980s by the government.

Mapungubwe was added to the South African grade 6 curriculum in 2003.

Burials at Mapungubwe Hill

At least twenty four skeletons were unearthed on Mapungubwe hill but only eleven were available for analysis, with the rest disintegrating upon touch or as soon as they were exposed to light and air. Most of the skeletal remains were buried with few or no accessories, with most adults buried with glass beads. Two adult burials (labeled numbers 10 and 14 by the early excavators) as well as one unlabelled skeleton (referred to as the original gold burial) were associated with gold artefacts and were unearthed from the so-called grave area upon Mapungubwe Hill. Recent genetic studies found these first two skeletons to be of Khoi/San descent and thought to be a king and queen of Mapungubwe. Despite this latest information the remains were all buried in the traditional Bantu burial position (sitting with legs drawn to the chest, arms folded round the front of the knees) and they were facing west. The skeleton numbered 10, a male, was buried with his hand grasping a golden scepter.

The skeleton labelled number 14 (female) was buried with at least 100 gold wire bangles around her ankles and there were at least one thousand gold beads in her grave. The last gold burial (male), who was most probably the king, was buried with a headrest and three objects made of gold foil tacked onto a wooden core, depicting a bowl, scepter and rhino. At least two more rhinos were in the sample, but their association with a specific grave is unknown.

In 2007, the South African Government gave the green light for the skeletal remains that were excavated in 1933 to be reburied on Mapungubwe Hill in a ceremony that took place on 20 November 2007.

The Mapungubwe Landscape was declared a World Heritage Site on 3 July 2003.

Mapungubwe National Park

The area is now part of Mapungubwe National Park, which in turn is part of the Greater Mapungubwe Transfrontier Conservation Area. South Africa's contribution to the trans-frontier conservation area consists of the Mapungubwe National Park, Venetia Limpopo Nature Reserve, Limpopo Valley Conservancy, Mapesu Private Game Reserve, the proposed Mogalakwena Game Reserve, the Vhembe Game Reserve as well as a number of smaller private farms. The total proposed area will be 256,100 hectares or 53% of the entire Greater Mapungubwe Transfrontier Conservation Area. Botswana's contribution to the Conservation Area consists of the Northern Tuli Game Reserve, covering an area of 71,173ha. In phase two the area is expected to increase in size with the inclusion of the Central Tuli Farms and the proposed Shashe CCA. In addition, the area roughly extending from the town of Mathathane North to Kobojango and onwards to the Shashe River will also form part of the GMTFCA. In total Botswana's contribution to the TFCA is expected to be 135,000ha, roughly 28% of the total area of the Greater Mapungubwe Transfrontier Conservation Area. Sentinel Ranch, Nottingham Estate and the Tuli Circle Safari Area make up Zimbabwe's contribution to the GMTFCA. In phase two the Maramani, Machuchuta as well as Hwali Wildlife Management Areas may also be included extending the size of Zimbabwe's contribution to the Greater Mapungubwe Transfrontier Conservation Area to 96,000 hectares or roughly 19%.

See also 

Other ruins in South Africa
Blaauboschkraal stone ruins in Mpumalanga
Machadodorp baKoni Ruins in Mpumalanga
Kaditshwene in North West province
Kweneng' Ruins in Gauteng
Mapungubwe in Limpopo
Sedan Beehive stone huts in Free State
Tlokwe Ruins in Gauteng
Thulamela in Kruger National Park, Limpopo
Similar ruins outside South Africa
Bumbusi in Zimbabwe
Danangombe in Zimbabwe
Engaruka in Tanzania
Khami in Zimbabwe
Manyikeni in Mozambique
Naletale in Zimbabwe
Thimlich Ohinga stone ruins in Kenya
Ziwa in Zimbabwe
 baKalanga
 Mapungubwe Collection
 Order of Mapungubwe
 List of Castles and Fortifications in South Africa

Notes

References

Duffey, Sian Tiley-Nel et al. The Art and Heritage Collections of the University of Pretoria.Univ. of Pretoria, 2008.

External links 
World History Encyclopedia – Mapungubwe
Mapungubwe National Park
 

States and territories established in the 1070s
13th-century disestablishments in Africa
Protected areas of South Africa
Archaeological sites in South Africa
History of South Africa
Tourism in South Africa
World Heritage Sites in South Africa
Former populated places in South Africa
South African heritage sites
Conservation and restoration of cultural heritage
1075 establishments
Countries in medieval Africa
Ruins in South Africa
Archaeological sites of Southern Africa
Archaeology of Southern Africa
Historic sites in South Africa
Former kingdoms